Martina Hill (born 14 July 1974) is a German actress and comedian. She has been awarded the German Comedy Award, the German TV Award, as well as the Adolf-Grimme-Preis and the Bambi Award.

Biography
Hill was born in Berlin-Wedding. Her mother was a nurse, and her father was a subway driver. After finishing her Abitur in 1995, she later studied drama.

Hill had her breakthrough in 2007, as an ensemble member of the ProSieben comedy show Switch reloaded, bringing her recognition as a comedian and impersonator. Her arguably most noticeable parodies were those of persona such as Heidi Klum, Angela Merkel, Daniela Katzenberger, Gundula Gause, Amy Winehouse and Dr. Temperance "Bones" Brennan.

In 2009, Hill began portraying "universal expert" Tina Hausten and social media influencer Larissa in the heute-show, a German adaptation of the American news satire The Daily Show. From 2011 onwards, Hill starred in her own format, Knallerfrauen, which is a sketch comedy known for sharp humor and its cutting wit. With the first series of Knallerfrauen, Hill also became very popular in China. <ref>Oliver Pöttgen: [http://www.stimmen-aus-china.de/2012/06/09/ausflippen-mit-martina-hill-zum-erfolg-der-sat1-serie-%E2%80%9Eknallerfrauen-in-china/ Ausflippen mit Martina Hill: Zum Erfolg der Sat1-Serie "Knallerfrauen" in China.]</ref>

In 2019 she became known to an even broader audience in Germany, when she started her own talk-show with a satirical touch. The "Martina-Hill-Schau" has run on SAT1 (along with Pro7 one of the larger, privatized television channels in Germany).

For her commitment in the Heute-Show she was awarded with numerous prizes up to date.

Filmography (selection)
 2003: Schwer verknallt, TV movie
 2004: Der Vater meines Sohnes, TV movie
 2004: Happy Friday, sketch show
 2005: Mädchen über Bord, TV movie
 2005: Cologne P.D., TV series
 2006: Das Beste aus meinem Leben, early-evening TV series
 2006: Kunstfehler, TV movie
 2006–2007: Alarm für Cobra 11 – Die Autobahnpolizei, "Flashback" to "Life & Death", TV series
 2007: Der Dicke, TV series
 2007: SOKO Wismar, TV series
 2007: 29 ... und noch Jungfrau, TV movie
 2007–2012: Switch reloaded, comedy series
 2008: Putzfrau Undercover, TV movie
 2008: Die Schnüfflerin – Peggy kann's nicht lassen, TV movie
 Since 2009: heute-show, news satire
 2010: Cindy aus Marzahn und die jungen Wilden, comedy show
 2010: C.I.S. – Chaoten im Sondereinsatz, TV movie
 2010: , TV movie
 2011: , movie
 Since 2011: Knallerfrauen, sketch comedy

Theater
 2000: Nonne Isabella in Die Rund- und die Spitzköpfe (Berlin)
 2000: Erna in Kasimir und Karoline (Berlin)
 2001: Medea in Medea (Berlin)
 2001: Die Frau auf dem Sockel in Die Frau auf dem Sockel (Berlin)
 2001: Marjorie in Extremities (Berlin)

Voice-over-work (selection)
 2009: The Haunted World of El Superbeasto, for Sheri Moon Zombie in the role of Suzi X
 2011: Cars 2, for Emily Mortimer in the role of Holley Shiftwell
 2013: Despicable Me 2, for Kristen Wiig in the role of Lucy
 2014: How To Train Your Dragon 2, for Cate Blanchett in the role of Valka

Awards

 2007
 Deutscher Comedypreis as a member of Switch reloaded (Best Sketch Comedy)
 2008
 Deutscher Fernsehpreis as a member of Switch reloaded (Best Comedy)
 Deutscher Comedypreis as a member of Switch reloaded (Best Sketch Comedy)
 2009
 Romy TV Award as a member of Switch reloaded (Special Jury Prize)
 Deutscher Comedypreis for Best Actress
 Deutscher Comedypreis as a member of the heute-show (Best Comedy Show)
 2010
 Adolf-Grimme-Preis as a member of the heute-show (Category Entertainment)
 Deutscher Fernsehpreis as a member of the heute-show (Category Best Comedy)
 Deutscher Comedypreis as a member of the heute-show (Category Best Comedy Show)
 2011
 Deutscher Comedypreis for Best Actress
 Deutscher Comedypreis as a member of the heute-show (Best Comedy Show)
 2012
 Deutscher Fernsehpreis for Knallerfrauen (Best Comedy Show)
 Deutscher Comedypreis for Best Actress
 Bambi Award (Category Comedy)
 2013
 Deutscher Comedypreis for Best Actress
 2014
 Bambi Award for the heute-show'' (Category Comedy)

References

External links

  
 

1974 births
Living people
Actresses from Berlin
People from Mitte
21st-century German actresses
German women comedians
German television actresses
German film actresses
German voice actresses
Sat.1 people
ZDF people